Scott Thomas Kowalkowski (born August 23, 1968) is a former American football linebacker who played for the Philadelphia Eagles and the Detroit Lions in a ten-year career that lasted from 1991 to 2001 in the National Football League.

Kowalkowski played college football at the University of Notre Dame and was drafted in the eighth round of the 1991 NFL Draft by the Eagles. His father, Bob Kowalkowski, also played with the Lions.

College career
Kowalkowski Earned All-American honorable mention recognition at defensive end as a junior in 1989 and at outside linebacker as a senior in 1990. Was the only Notre Dame player to play in every game from 1987-90.

Professional career

Philadelphia Eagles
Kowalkowski was drafted by Philadelphia Eagles in the eight round (216th overall) of the 1991 NFL Draft. He played in all 16 games on special teams… Saw limited action on defense during the 1991 season. In the 1992 Kowalkowski made a touchdown-saving tackle on a kickoff return in playoff loss against the Dallas Cowboys. In 1993 Kowalkowski suffering ankle injury in 1993 Preseason then the Eagles released him in November 1993.

Detroit Lions
Kowalkowski signed with Lions after the 1993 Season and he played in all 16 games in 1994, exclusively on special teams, making seven stops… Recorded his first tackle as a Lion (on special teams) against Dallas Cowboys on September 19th. In 1995 season Kowalkowski Named Detroit Lions Quarterback Club Special Teams MVP… Third on team with 13 special teams stops… Played almost exclusively on special teams throughout the season, with most extensive action at middle linebacker coming against Jacksonville Jaguars on December 17th, when he made his only two defensive stops of the year… Posted a season-high three special teams tackles against Cleveland Browns on October 8th and also tied that output against Tampa Bay on November 12. Spelled Mike Johnson at outside linebacker during a series at Chicago on November 19 for first defensive action of year. Kowalkowski name special teams captain in the 1996 season, he finished second on the team with 12 special teams tackles… Recovered a fumbled kickoff at the Bears’ 21-yard line, setting up Detroit’s second TD against the Chicago Bears on September 22. Led team with three special teams tackles at Tampa Bay September 29. Made the first start of his career at Oakland October 13th at weak-side linebacker for injured Stephen Boyd and made career-high six tackles… Saw action in the Lions’ nickel package in place of the injured Bennie Blades against Green Bay Packers on December 15th 1996.

Personal life
Kowalkowski played high school football at Saint Mary's Preparatory in Orchard Lake, Michigan, where he was an All-American defensive lineman. He graduated from Saint Mary's in 1987.

Kowalkowski and his family currently reside in Lake Orion, Michigan.

NFL career statistics

Regular season

References

1968 births
Living people
People from Royal Oak, Michigan
American football linebackers
Philadelphia Eagles players
Detroit Lions players
Notre Dame Fighting Irish football players
People from Lake Orion, Michigan
St. Mary's Preparatory alumni